Mtel may refer to:

 Massachusetts Tests for Educator Licensure
 Mtel (Bosnia and Herzegovina), a telecommunications company in Bosnia and Herzegovina
 Mtel (Montenegro), a telecommunication company in Montenegro
 Mtel (Nigeria), the mobile telephony arm of NITEL, Nigeria's principal telecom